The NBA G League Finals Most Valuable Player is an annual award given by the NBA G League since 2015, when the competition was known as the NBA Development League (D-League), to the best performing player of the championship series. Elliot Williams of the Santa Cruz Warriors was named the inaugural winner of the award after leading the Warriors to a 2–0 Finals series victory over the Fort Wayne Mad Ants in 2015.

Winners

See also
Bill Russell NBA Finals Most Valuable Player Award

References

National Basketball Association lists
Valuable
Awards established in 2015
National Basketball Association most valuable player awards
Basketball most valuable player awards
2015 establishments in the United States